Mycobacterium parmense is a species of Mycobacterium.

It is closely related to Mycobacterium heidelbergense.

It is also closely related to Mycobacterium lentiflavum and Mycobacterium simiae.

References

External links
Type strain of Mycobacterium parmense at BacDive -  the Bacterial Diversity Metadatabase

parmense